State of Shock is the fifth solo studio album by American hard rock musician Ted Nugent. It was released in May 1979 by Epic Records.

State of Shock closed a decade in which Nugent took his hard-rocking wildman persona to the top of the charts. Although the album reached the U.S. Top 20 and quickly went gold, it is Nugent's first solo album not to attain a platinum certification.

The best known track remains the album opener "Paralyzed", which was performed live on a 1980 episode of the TV show Fridays, and turned up again a year later on Great Gonzos! The Best of Ted Nugent. Other highlights include "Saddle Sore" and "Alone", a rare power ballad for him, sung by Charlie Huhn. A live show from this era is captured on the 1997 archive release Live at Hammersmith '79.

Track listing
All songs written and arranged by Ted Nugent, except "I Want to Tell You", written by George Harrison

Personnel
Band members
 Ted Nugent – lead and rhythm guitars, lead vocals (on tracks 1, 2, 5), backing vocals, percussion
 Charlie Huhn – lead vocals (on tracks 3, 4, 6, 7, 8, 9), backing vocals
 Walt Monaghan – bass
 Cliff Davies – drums, lead vocals (on track 10), backing vocals, producer

Additional musicians
 Leah Kilburn – backing vocals (on track 3)

Production
 Lew Futterman – producer
 Tim Geelan – engineer
 David Gotlieb, Lou Schlossberg – assistant engineers
 David McCullough – mixing assistant
 Bob Heimall – art direction
 Gerard Huertia – lettering
 Ron Pownall – photography
 David Krebs, Steve Leber – directors

Charts
Album

Certifications

See also

Ted Nugent discography

References

1979 albums
Ted Nugent albums
Epic Records albums